The Cotter Baronetcy, of Rockforest in the County of Cork, is a title in the Baronetage of Ireland. It was created on 11 August 1763 for James Cotter, Member of the Irish House of Commons for Askeaton. He was the son of the executed James Cotter the Younger. The authorities intervened in the education of the first baronet and his siblings who were raised as Protestants. This act eliminated one of the families who formed the hereditary leadership of the Catholic community in Ireland. Ultimately, the descendants of Sir James Fitz Edmond Cotter retained their wealth and political prominence, but at the cost of losing the faith and culture their ancestors long upheld. The first baronet's grandson, the third baronet (who succeeded his father), represented Mallow in the British House of Commons. The latter's great-grandson (the title having descended from father to son except for the fourth baronet who was succeeded by his grandson), the sixth baronet, was a Lieutenant-Colonel in the 13th/18th Regiment of the Royal Hussars and fought in the Second World War, where he was awarded the Distinguished Service Order.

The title is currently held by the seventh baronet's son, the eight baronet, who succeeded his father in 2023.

Cotter Baronets, of Rockforest (1763)
Sir James Cotter, 1st Baronet (c. 1714–1770) 
Sir James Laurence Cotter, 2nd Baronet (c. 1748–1829) 
Sir James Laurence Cotter, 3rd Baronet (c. 1787–1834) 
Sir James Laurence Cotter, 4th Baronet (1828–1902) 
Sir James Laurence Cotter, 5th Baronet (1887–1924) 
Sir Delaval James Alfred Cotter, 6th Baronet (1911–2001) 
Sir Patrick Laurence Delaval Cotter, 7th Baronet (1941–2023)
Sir Julius Laurence George Cotter, 8th Baronet (born 1968)

The heir presumptive is the current holder's cousin, Stuart Cotter (born 1954)

See also
Cotter family

Notes

References 
Kidd, Charles, Williamson, David (editors). Debrett's Peerage and Baronetage (1990 edition). New York: St Martin's Press, 1990, 

Baronetcies in the Baronetage of Ireland
1763 establishments in Ireland